Thryptomene australis, commonly known as hook-leaf thryptomene, is a species of flowering plant in the family Myrtaceae and is endemic to the south-west of Western Australia. It is an erect, bushy and spreading shrub with upward-pointing leaves with the tip curving outwards, and flowers with white petals arranged spike-like near the ends of the branchlets.

Description
The flowers are arranged in pairs in up to eleven leaf axils near the end of branchlets.

Taxonomy
Thryptomene australis was first formally described in 1838 by Stephan Ladislaus Endlicher in Stirpium Australasicarum Herbarii Hugeliani Decades Tres, published in the journal Annalen des Wiener Museums der Naturgeschichte and was the first species of Thryptomene described. The specific epithet (australis) means "southern".

In 2001, Barbara Lynette Rye and Malcolm Eric Trudgen described two subspecies in the journal Nuytsia and the names are accepted by the Australian Plant Census:

Distribution and habitat
Both subspecies of hook-leaf thryptomene are widely distributed in the south-west of Western Australia where they  mainly grow on granite outcrops but also on plains, around salt lakes and creeklines and in firebreaks in gravelly, sandy, clay or loamy soils. The species occurs in the Avon Wheatbelt, Esperance Plains, Mallee and Coolgardie biogeographic regions but  subsp. australis is mostly absent from the last of these.

Conservation status
Both subspecies of Thryptomene australis are list as "not threatened" by the Western Australian Government Department of Parks and Wildlife.

References

australis
Endemic flora of Western Australia
Rosids of Western Australia
Taxa named by Stephan Endlicher
Plants described in 1838